Gardangah-e Quchemi (also Romanized as Gardangāh-e Qūchemī; also known as Gardāngāh) is a village in Homeyl Rural District, Homeyl District, Eslamabad-e Gharb County, Kermanshah Province, Iran. At the 2006 census, its population was 838, in 187 families.

References 

Populated places in Eslamabad-e Gharb County